Liliʻuokalani (September 2, 1838 – November 11, 1917) was the first queen regnant and last sovereign monarch of the Kingdom of Hawaiʻi.  After King Kalākaua brother and heir apparent Leleiohoku II died April 9, 1877, he proclaimed his sister Liliʻuokalani to be his successor. Upon his 1891 death, she ascended to the throne, ruling from January 29, 1891, until the overthrow of the Kingdom of Hawaiʻi on January 17, 1893.

She was tried and convicted in 1895 by the military commission of the Republic of Hawaii for involvement in a counter-revolution.  Her sentence was commuted to imprisonment in the palace. The composer of "Aloha ʻOe" and numerous other works,  she wrote her autobiography Hawaiʻi's Story by Hawaiʻi's Queen during her confinement, and began the English translation of the Kumulipo, the Hawaiian story of creation.  After her pardon in 1896, she spent an extended period with family in Boston, while traveling to Washington, DC to petition against the American annexation of Hawai‘i. Her translation of the Kumulipo was published by Lee & Shepard in 1897.

The following is a list of scholarly and historical resources related to Hawaiʻi's last monarch.

As author/composer/translator

Biographies of Liliʻuokalani

Biographies of related people

Hawaiian National Bibliography

General

Government records

Cabinet Ministers

Privy Council of State 

Minutes of the Privy Council, 1873–1892

General related records

Historiography

Journals

Thrum's Almanac 

Death, Lying-in-State and Obsequies of Queen Liliuokalani

Primary sources

See also 
Bibliography of Kalākaua
MOS Hawaii-related articles

Maps

References

External links 

 

Bibliographies of people
Bibliographies of American writers
History of Hawaii
House of Kalākaua
Political bibliographies